Booker High School may refer to:

Booker High School (Florida) — Sarasota, Florida
Booker High School (Texas) — Booker, Texas
Booker T. Crenshaw Christian School — San Diego, California

See also 
 Booker T. Washington High School (disambiguation)